The women's long jump event at the 1982 Commonwealth Games was held on 7 and 8 October at the QE II Stadium in Brisbane, Australia.

Medalists

Results

Qualification

Final

References

Final results (The Canberra Times)
Australian results 

Athletics at the 1982 Commonwealth Games
1982